Menajahtwa was a female rap duo from Compton, California composed of female rappers Spice and Royal T. They were signed to Eazy-E's Ruthless Records in the 1990s.

History
The duo made their debut in 1992 on Eazy-E's EP, 5150: Home 4 tha Sick on the track entitled "Merry Muthafuckin' Xmas" alongside Eazy-E, Buckwheat and Atban Klann. Two years later, on August 23, 1994, Menajahtwa released their first and only album entitled Cha-Licious, which featured production from Eazy-E, DJ Yella, Rhythum D and DJ U-Neek. The album spawned two singles "La La La" and "Giv Tha Azz 2 No 1", however the album did not do well and neither the album nor the singles charted. Despite the albums' miscomings they would stay together for a few more years and appeared on Eazy-E's 1995 song "Gangsta Beat 4 Tha Street", and on Adina Howard's 1997 "Swerve On". As well as writing Adina Howards "Freak And You Know It" produced by DJ Quik. Shortly after "Swerve On" the duo disbanded, but remain best friends to this day.

Discography

Hip hop groups from California
Women hip hop groups
Musicians from Compton, California
American musical duos
Hip hop duos
Ruthless Records artists
African-American women rappers
American women rappers